Lanmaoa is a fungal genus in the family Boletaceae. It was circumscribed by Chinese mycologists Nian-Kai Zeng and Zhu L. Yang in 2015 to contain several species formerly classified in the genus Boletus (L. carminipes, L. flavorubra, L. pseudosensibilis), as well as the newly described Asian boletes L. angustispora and L. asiatica. The erection of this genus follows recent molecular studies that outlined a new phylogenetic framework for the family Boletaceae. Zeng and Yang named the genus after Chinese naturalist  (1397-1476).

References

External links

Boletaceae
Boletales genera